Madison County Courthouse is a historic courthouse building located at Marshall, Madison County, North Carolina.  It was designed by noted Asheville architectural firm of Smith & Carrier and built in 1907.  It is two-story, brick, Classical Revival style building.  It has a hipped roof topped by a four-stage polygonal cupola.  The front facade features a tetrastyle pedimented Corinthian order portico.

It was listed on the National Register of Historic Places in 1979.  It is located in the Marshall Main Street Historic District.

References

County courthouses in North Carolina
Courthouses on the National Register of Historic Places in North Carolina
Neoclassical architecture in North Carolina
Government buildings completed in 1907
Buildings and structures in Madison County, North Carolina
National Register of Historic Places in Madison County, North Carolina
Individually listed contributing properties to historic districts on the National Register in North Carolina